Leptolaena pauciflora is a species of flowering plant in the Sarcolaenaceae family. It is found only in Madagascar. Its natural habitats are subtropical or tropical moist lowland forests, subtropical or tropical high-altitude shrubland, and sandy shores.
It is threatened by habitat loss. The specific epithet pauciflora is Latin for 'few-flowered'.

References

pauciflora
Endemic flora of Madagascar
Endangered plants
Taxonomy articles created by Polbot
Flora of the Madagascar subhumid forests